Nikolai Fedotovich Izmerov (19 December 1927 – 23 December 2016) was a Soviet and Russian occupational hygienist and public figure, who made significant contributions to occupational hygiene.

Early life 
Nikolai Izmerov was born in Frunze (Bishkek today), Kyrgyzstan in 1927, to Izmerov Fedot Fedotovich (1885) and Izmerova Evdokia Filatovna (née Shemilina) (1892). 

He was educated at a 10-years school in Jambul (Kyrgyzstan), and began studying to become a railway engineer. But after 2 years of study Izmerov entered the Tashkent Medical Institute (Faculty of Hygiene) in 1946.
 
Izmerov believed that his choice was determined by his Christian upbringing, received from believing parents; and by the sense of compassion for sick people he saw in hospitals.

Early work 
Izmerov entered the Central Institute of Advanced Medical Training (1952) after graduation in the Tashkent Medical Institute and Clinical Training in Hygiene. After additional studying, he became a senior inspector in the Ministry of Health in 1953–1955.

He prepared and defended the dissertation of the candidate of medical sciences “Air pollution with gasoline vapor and its maximum permissible concentration” in the Central Institute of Advanced Medical Training in 1958.

Izmerov became Deputy head of the Department of external relations of the Ministry of Health of the USSR in 1960, and in 1962-64 — Deputy Minister of health, chief sanitary doctor of the RSFSR. N. Izmerov developed standards for occupational and environmental hygiene. He continued his work in this area even later.

In World Health Organization 
He had been recommended to work in the World Health Organization (WHO) as assistant Director-General by the Ministry of Health; and he worked in Geneva for 7 years from 1964 to 1971. Izmerov was responsible for environmental health: environmental toxicants, water and air pollutants. He guided the United States to establish their National Water Programmes. His work has influenced the WHO's significant contributions to the UN International Water Decade 1965–1974. Izmerov's experience gained in developing hygiene standards previously helped him to do this work.

Research Institute of Occupational Health and Diseases (AMS) 

Izmerov returned to Moscow in 1971 and was elected head of the Research Institute of Occupational Health and Diseases (in Academy of Medical Sciences, the leading institute in this field in the USSR and in RF, and the world's oldest scientific institute of occupational diseases). As the head of the institute (director for 1971–2012, scientific director for 2012-2015) he has done a lot to improve the work of the institute: the development of fundamental research in the field of occupational health, the development of permissible exposure limits, the development of manuals and textbooks, the implementation of research results in the practice of protection of workers. Some of the toxicological research results were used by the World Health Organization (WHO) and the International Programme on Chemical Safety.

The work of the institute (and other similar institutions) received a positive assessment from the American specialists earlier.

The director of the institute focused the attention of his experienced and qualified staff on the development of methods of prevention of occupational diseases; principles and methods of improving working conditions, the environment, and saving the health of workers. The institute became one of the leading occupational health institutes in the world. Izmerov signatories of the WHO "Declaration on Occupational Health for All" in 1994 as a director of a leading national OHS Institute.

The institute established the laboratory of women's occupational health (in 1974), the Department of social and hygienic research, equipped with modern technology and successfully implementing the latest technology.

The specific features of the Soviet centralized planned state management led to the fact that the scientific developments of the institute became the requirements of legislation very often, and them were implemented in the enterprises. A characteristic feature of these works in the field of occupational health was their focus on the elimination of the causes of diseases and their prevention. This occupational medicine was integrated with the public health system and with the general sanitary hygiene services. According to Western hygienists, this feature led to the fact that the developed requirements were "too idealistic."

Izmerov became a doctor of medical sciences in 1973; professor in 1977; and a corresponding member of the Academy of Medical Sciences in 1980. He continued international activities as the institute director. Izmerov became an academician in 1986.

The institute developed exposure limits for chemicals, physical hazards., and non-toxic dust (which causes pneumoconiosis). If the low level of science and technology did not allow to fulfill the requirements, then the institute has developed a classification of working conditions according to the degree of danger (classes of work); and led the development of alternative methods of protecting health (aka. protection by reducing exposure time; protection by distance and shielding, etc.). Izmerov led the development of risk assessment methods for the cases of the employee's simultaneous exposure to the various types of occupational hazards. The institute was established museum of occupational hygiene in 1987

Nikolai Izmerov published over 500 journal papers (and other publications), several textbooks and manuals; and created a school of hygienists. 27 candidates and 32 doctors of science were trained under his leadership and during his consultations. He was editor of the articles in the Great Medical Encyclopedia, and ILO OHS Encyclopedia; and chief editor of the magazine "Occupational Health and Industrial Ecology". Izmerov worked at the First Moscow State Medical University as head of the department of occupational health.

Work in new socioeconomic conditions (1991-2016) 

The destruction of the planned Soviet economy dealt a heavy blow to the national economy, and a very strong blow to the occupational health and safety system. Academician Izmerov, as a highly qualified and experienced professional, was well aware of the consequences of irresponsible actions, and was sensitive to the destruction of a scientifically based system of the workers' health protection.

The system of registration of occupational diseases had not normally operated in the USSR since 1936: most of the cases of occupational diseases were not registered for ideological reasons, to simulate a good state of occupational health, and to demonstrate the advantages of the soviet state system. It was bad, but the state still seriously tried to improve working conditions and provide preventive medical care to employees directly at the enterprises (as a priority). This approach has been used in other countries later. For example, the Hyundai Motor Company used the instruction (which was translated from Russian to Korean) to organize the medical care of its employees

But after 1991, the preservation of the negative tradition (not registering occupational diseases) allowed the new owners of enterprises to be guaranteed a complete lack of responsibility for damage to the health of employees - and them took advantage of this:  ... the numbers of work accidents and the incidence of occupational injuries and diseases … remain unacceptably high, which may have serious consequences in terms of the deterioration of workers’ health … 

... now workers have to pay with their health to survive ...

... the mortality rate of citizens of the RF at working age is 4.5 times higher than that in the European Union, and exceeds the mortality rate developing countries 1.5 times ... "

Registration of a small proportion of cases of occupational diseases. (and accidents) deprives the OHS system of the "feedback" pile: employers do not bear the consequences for irresponsible actions. In his eyes, the new owners of enterprises, interested only in obtaining financial profits in the short term, almost completely destroyed the medical units that were available in all large enterprises with harmful working conditions. Workers were left without normal medical prevention. The significant deterioration of the conditions in the workplaces contributed to the sharp decline in life expectancy for men. For example, 65 years for those born in 1987 and only 57 years for those born in 1992. Those workers who reach retirement age suffered from one or two diseases in 70% of cases. The reason is that employees work in poor conditions, did not undergo medical examinations, the diseases are detected too late and them not treated

Academician Izmerov used all his authority and all his powers to change this situation. The concept and project of the Presidential Program “Health of the Working Population of Russia for 2004-2015” was developed under the leadership of Izmerov, and it was reviewed by specialists. Then the program was reviewed and approved by the State Duma of the Russian Federation.

However, a change in the country's leadership, in general, did not change the new attitude to occupational health. The program was not implemented; the registration of an insignificant share of occupational diseases was preserved, and it was supplemented by incomplete registration of fatal accidents at workplaces. Izmerov wasn't heard neither the employers, nor leaders of the country.

Izmerov organized, and he led the preparation and holding (until 2015) of all-Russian congresses with international participation "Profession and Health" (since 2002).

Izmerov was a member of International Committee on Occupational medicine (Stockholm, Sweden), Collegium Ramazzini (Italy), Chinese Academy of Preventive Medicine (PRC) etc.

Personal life 
Izmerov was married to Tatyana Nikolaevna Naumova (born 1924) in 1955. They lived together for 20 years, in 1961 their daughter Catherine was born. In 1976, a divorce occurred.

Izmerov married Natalia Ivanovna Demicheva (born 1947) in 1985. Natalia Ivanovna (born 1947) is professor, dermatovenerologist, specialist in occupational diseases.

He had two daughters, four granddaughters, and one grandson.

Izmerov was fond of poetry, classical music, and ballet.

Death 
Izmerov died on December 23, 2016 after a long and serious illness in Moscow, and was buried at Troyekurovskoye Cemetery.

The Research Institute of Occupational Medicine of the RAS was named after academician Izmerov in 2017 by order of the Director of the Federal Agency of Scientific Organizations (FANO).

Awards 
 Order of the Red Banner of Labour (in 1969 and 1977)
 Order of the October Revolution (1987)
 Order "For Merit to the Fatherland" 2nd (2008), 3rd (2003) and 4th classes (1997).

References 
Publications that are available in English:

Publications that are only available in Russian:

External links 
 In English

 In Russian

 15 minutes.

 17 minutes.

1927 births
2016 deaths
20th-century Russian physicians
21st-century Russian physicians
People from Bishkek
Academicians of the Russian Academy of Medical Sciences
Academicians of the USSR Academy of Medical Sciences
Full Members of the USSR Academy of Sciences
Honoured Scientists of the Russian Federation
Recipients of the Order "For Merit to the Fatherland", 2nd class
Recipients of the Order "For Merit to the Fatherland", 3rd class
Recipients of the Order "For Merit to the Fatherland", 4th class
Recipients of the Order of the Red Banner of Labour
Hygienists
Occupational safety and health
Textbook writers
Russian expatriates in Switzerland
Russian public health doctors
Soviet expatriates in Switzerland
Soviet public health doctors
Burials in Troyekurovskoye Cemetery